The First 10 Explosive Years is a 1999 compilation album by British rock band Atomic Rooster. It is on the Angel Air record label and, like all their Atomic Rooster and related-artists releases, is derived from original tapes owned and remastered by John Du Cann.

Whilst being a very good compilation for fans of the band, it consists entirely of unlicensed tracks, whose copyright is owned by Sanctuary (who purchased the B&C and Dawn catalogues), EMI and Polydor Records.

It has been reissued and repackaged at least twice:
In 2004, it was teamed with The First Ten Explosive Years Volume 2 and released on the Recall Records label (a subsidiary of Snapper Music) as a double CD titled Tomorrow Night.

In 2005, it was reissued on the German Ambitions/Membran International label as disc one in a two-disc set entitled Rebel with a Clause. The second disc was the 11 track reissue of Headline News.

Track listing (with spelling and title corrections)
"Sleeping for Years" 5:26
"Seven Streets" 6:41
"I Can't Take No More" 3:31
"Taken You Over"  "They Took Control of You" 4:48
"Lost in Space" 5:51
"Play it Again" 3:10
"Devil’s Answer" 4:09 - live in Milan 1981
"Rebel with a Clause" a.k.a. "Start to Live" 2:56
"Night Living" a.k.a. "Living Underground" 3:36
"Death Walks Behind You" 7:18
"It's So Unkind" 4:05
"When You Go to Bed" 3:42
"Head in the Sky" 5:38
"Break the Ice" 4:57
"Play the Game" 4:45
"Tomorrow Night" 4:50 - live studio version 1981

Atomic Rooster compilation albums
Angel Air albums
1999 compilation albums